Temperence Hill (March 1977 – June 2003) was a Champion American Thoroughbred racehorse.

Background
Temperence Hill was a bay horse bred in Kentucky by Dr. Albert F. Polk, Jr.'s Oriskany Farm. He was sired by Stop The Music out of the Etonian mare, Sister Shannon. He was named for a 19th-century Arkansas Methodist church that his owner's ancestors attended.

Temperence Hill was consigned to the 1978 Keeneland September yearling sale, where he was purchased and raced by Arkansas lumberman John Ed Anthony and his former wife, Mary Lynn Dudley under their Loblolly Stable colors. He was trained throughout his career by Joseph B. Cantey.

Racing career
After showing strong potential throughout the spring of 1980, with wins in Kentucky Derby prep races, the Rebel Stakes and Arkansas Derby, Temperence Hill's breakthrough performance came in the 1980 Belmont Stakes where he defeated Kentucky Derby winner Genuine Risk and Preakness Stakes winner Codex at odds of 53-1. He went on to win several additional Grade I stakes and was voted Champion three-year-old of 1980.

Stud record
Temperence Hill was retired after the 1981 racing season with career earnings of $1,567,650. He was syndicated and began his stallion career near Lexington, Kentucky at Gainesway Farm. In the early 1990s he was moved to Bonnerdale, Arkansas where he stood at D-Lan Farms and then Starr Farm. In the fall of 1996, he was sold to Thailand's only thoroughbred farm owner, Police General Sharlie Pekanan. Temperence Hill died peacefully in 2003 at SawangJai Farm 2 hours from Bangkok along the Friendship Highway near Bangkok, Thailand.

In 16 seasons of breeding in North America, Temperence Hill sired 3 foreign champions, 39 stakes winners, and 433 winners from 602 starters with total earnings of $26,538,905. The best of his runners was Temperate Sil who won the 1986 Hollywood Futurity and in 1987, the Santa Anita Derby and the Swaps Stakes.

Pedigree

References

1977 racehorse births
2003 racehorse deaths
Racehorses bred in Kentucky
Racehorses trained in the United States
Belmont Stakes winners
Eclipse Award winners
Thoroughbred family 4-f